Ding Ding (born 17 August 1977) is a former professional tennis player from China.

Ding played in three Fed Cup ties for China in 1999, which included a win over former world No. 57, Park Sung-hee.

On the professional tour she had a best singles ranking of 228 in the world and made the round of 16 at the 1998 Volvo Women's Open in Pattaya, playing as a qualifier.

ITF finals

Singles (2–4)

Doubles (3–4)

See also
 List of China Fed Cup team representatives

References

External links
 
 
 

1977 births
Living people
Chinese female tennis players
Universiade medalists in tennis
Universiade bronze medalists for China